Dongfang Bubai, literally "Invincible East", is a fictional character in the wuxia novel The Smiling, Proud Wanderer by Jin Yong. He is the leader of the Sun Moon Holy Cult, an "unorthodox" martial arts school. In his quest to dominate the wulin (martial artists' community), he castrated himself to fulfil the prerequisite for learning the skills in a martial arts manual known as the Sunflower Manual, and became a formidable martial artist after mastering those skills. His castration and supreme prowess in martial arts make him one of the most memorable characters in Jin Yong's wuxia universe even though he appears in only one chapter of the novel. His name has also become virtually synonymous with homosexuality and LGBT sexual orientations in Chinese popular culture.

Role in the novel 
Dongfang Bubai makes his dramatic physical appearance in only one chapter of the novel, but his character is pivotal and indispensable to the essence of the story and is continually referenced in vital ways throughout the plot. For example, Ren Woxing ranks him first on a list of "three and a half" persons he most respects and admires. Dongfang Bubai's captivating and provocative character has enabled his role to be largely expanded in films and television series adapted from the novel. He is first mentioned by name in the novel as a deputy to Ren Woxing, the leader of the Sun Moon Holy Cult. Through a scheme, he ousts Ren Woxing from power, imprisons him in an underground dungeon in Hangzhou, and thereafter seizes the leadership position. He treats his subordinates cruelly and forces them to submit to him by making them consume poison pills. After taking the pill, the person will suffer a long and painful death. However, if the person submits to him and obeys his orders, they will be given an antidote to temporarily ease their suffering for a limited period of time.

Dongfang Bubai castrated himself to fulfil the prerequisite for learning the skills in the Sunflower Manual and became an extremely formidable martial artist after mastering those skills. However, his personality became more feminine as a consequence and he developed an intimate relationship with a male lover, Yang Lianting. He neglects the cult's affairs and leaves them to Yang.

Ren Woxing eventually escapes from the dungeon with Linghu Chong's help and gradually wins back allegiance from his former followers. Ren Woxing, along with his daughter Ren Yingying, Linghu Chong, and another follower Xiang Wentian, sneak back to the cult to confront Dongfang Bubai. In the ensuing fight, Dongfang Bubai is invincible and gains the upper hand despite being outnumbered three-to-one. However, he loses focus after Yang Lianting is injured and abused by Ren Yingying on the sidelines. His three opponents seize the opportunity to inflict devastating blows on him. Dongfang Bubai is critically wounded and eventually killed by Ren Woxing. Just before his death, he manages to blind Ren Woxing in one eye with his needles.

Sunflower Manual 
The Sunflower Manual was written by a eunuch and was discovered by Yue Su and Cai Zifeng, two members of the Mount Hua School, in the library of the Shaolin School. In their attempt to copy the manual, each of them read half of the manual and memorised it before returning to Mount Hua. However, when they tried to piece together what they read, they found the final copy to be incomprehensible. Each of them believed that his memory of the manual is better than that of the other, but none of them was able to come up with something that made sense. Nevertheless, Yue Su and Cai Zifeng managed to integrate what they learnt from the manual into their existing skills and made significant improvements in their mastery of martial arts. At the same time, this also resulted in a rivalry between Yue Su and Cai Zifeng because they started concentrating on qi (inner energy) and swordplay techniques respectively. The Mount Hua School split into the Qi and Sword factions as a consequence.

The abbot of the Shaolin School recognised the evil nature and inherent dangers of practising the skills in the Sunflower Manual so he sent a monk, Duyuan, to serve as a mediator in the conflict between the two factions and dissuade them from practising the skills in the manual. Yue Su and Cai Zifeng apologise for their folly and seek Duyuan's help in trying to better understand the manual. Duyuan is able to make logical conclusions about the manual based on Yue Su and Cai Zifeng's recollections, and thereby compile a comprehensible version of the manual. This copy falls into the hands of the Sun Moon Holy Cult (and later into Dongfang Bubai's hands) when the cult took advantage of the internal conflict in the Mount Hua School to attack them.

While working with Yue Su and Cai Zifeng, Duyuan himself gradually became increasingly obsessed with the Sunflower Manual and his mind was totally corrupted by it. He secretly developed a new skill, Bixie Swordplay, based on his own interpretation of the manual and wrote the instructions on his kasaya. Later, he renounced his vows as a monk, returned to secular life, and assumed his former name, Lin Yuantu. The Bixie Swordplay bears similarities to the original Sunflower Manual, one of which is that any man who wishes to learn either of these skills must castrate himself before he starts practising the skills.

Appearances in media

Film 
Brigitte Lin portrayed Dongfang Bubai in the 1992 film Swordsman II, a sequel to The Swordsman. The plot differs largely from the novel and Dongfang Bubai is given a more prominent role as the primary antagonist. The following year, the producers released the film The East Is Red, with Dongfang Bubai as the main character. The East Is Red is unrelated to the novel except for its Chinese title Dongfang Bubai zhi Fengyun Zaiqi, which roughly translates to The Return of Dongfang Bubai. Lin's portrayal of Dongfang Bubai as a trans woman has influenced subsequent portrayals of the character; Dongfang Bubai has typically been depicted as a trans woman in television series based on The Smiling, Proud Wanderer since the 2000s. Dongfang Bubai is also referred to as "Invincible Asia" in the subtitles of Swordsman II and The East Is Red.

Television 
Notable actors and actresses who have portrayed Dongfang Bubai in television series include: 
 Kong Ngai, in The Smiling, Proud Wanderer (1984); 
 Henry Lo (魯振順), in State of Divinity (1996);
 Leanne Liu, in State of Divinity (2000);
 Jacelyn Tay, in The Legendary Swordsman (2000);
 Mao Weitao, in Laughing in the Wind (2001);
 Joe Chen, in Swordsman (2013);
 Ding Yuxi, in New Smiling, Proud Wanderer (2018 TV series).

Comics 
A manhua series titled Dongfang Bubai was drawn in 1991 by Hong Kong artist Khoo Fuk-lung.

Music 
The Chinese electronic music artist Tzusing released an experimental techno album with that title in February 2017.

Analogues 
Dongfang Bubai inspired the character Master Asia in the anime Mobile Fighter G Gundam. Master Asia is also known as Tohō Fuhai, which is the Japanese reading of the Hanzi characters as Kanji.

In the manga Rosario + Vampire, the character Dongfang Bubai is a yōkai and he leads a triad family.

References 

  Tan, Xianmao (2005). Dongfang Bubai: The Invincible Devil Who is a Transsexual. In Rankings of Jin Yong's Characters. Chinese Agricultural Press.

Literary characters introduced in 1967
Jin Yong characters
Fictional gay males
Fictional wushu practitioners
The Smiling, Proud Wanderer
Fictional Chinese people
Fictional LGBT characters in literature
Fictional transgender women
Fictional LGBT characters in film
Fictional LGBT characters in television